Saniella is a flowering plant genus in the family Hypoxidaceae, native to South Africa and Lesotho. Two species are recognised:

Saniella occidentalis (Nel) B.L.Burtt -- Cape Province
Saniella verna Hilliard & B.L.Burtt  -- Cape Province and Lesotho

References

External links

Hypoxidaceae
Asparagales genera
Flora of Lesotho
Flora of South Africa